The following articles relate to the history, geography, geology, flora, fauna, structures and recreation in Yellowstone National Park.

Yellowstone National Park history

 Exploration
 Cook–Folsom–Peterson Expedition - 1869 exploration of Yellowstone river and lake
 Washburn–Langford–Doane Expedition - 1870 exploration of Yellowstone river, lake and Firehole river basin
 Fort Ellis - Starting point of the Washburn Expedition
 Hayden Geological Survey of 1871 - First of five surveys by Hayden in Yellowstone
 Native Americans
 Nez Perce National Historic Trail - Nez Perce tribe traversed Yellowstone during Nez Perce War of 1877
 People
 Explorers
 Robert Adams, Jr. - U.S. Geological Surveys 1871-1875
 Jim Bridger - Mountain man familiar with Yellowstone region (1856)
 John Colter - First person of European descent to visit Yellowstone region
 Lt.Gustavus C. Doane - U.S. Army Cavalry escort during Washburn expedition of 1870
 Truman C. Everts - former U.S. Assessor for the Montana Territory, member of Washburn Expedition
 Warren Angus Ferris - Early Yellowstone region trapper
 Arnold Hague - U.S. Geological Surveys 1880s
 Ferdinand Vandeveer Hayden - U.S. Geological Surveys 1871-1875
 Nathaniel P. Langford - Member of Washburn expedition and first park superintendent
 William F. Raynolds - Early explorer in Yellowstone region
 Alexander Ross (fur trader) - Early fur trader in Yellowstone region
 Osborne Russell - Early trapper to visit region and describe the Lamar Valley (1834)
 Cyrus Thomas - agricultural statistician and entomologist on the 1871 Hayden survey
 Henry D. Washburn - Leader of Washburn expedition
 Park superintendents and administrators
 Horace M. Albright - Park superintendent (1919–1929)
 Frazier Boutelle - Park superintendent (1889–1890)
 Harry W. Frantz - Director of publicity 1923 - named Grand Loop Road
 John W. Meldrum - 1st U.S. Commissioner to Yellowstone (1894–1935)
 Philetus Norris - Second park superintendent
 Park rangers
 Harry Yount - First park ranger
 Isabel Bassett Wasson - the first female ranger in Yellowstone
 Engineers and architects
 Hiram M. Chittenden - U.S. Army Engineer
 Dan Christie Kingman - U.S. Army Engineer
 Herbert Maier - Yellowstone architect (1929–31)
 Robert Reamer - Old Faithful Inn architect
 Photographers, artists and illustrators
 Heinrich C. Berann - Panoramic artist
 Albert Bierstadt - Early Yellowstone artist
 Frank Jay Haynes - Official park photographer 1884-1921
 William Henry Jackson - US Geological Survey photographer 1869-1878
 Thomas Moran - Early Yellowstone artist - guest member of 1871 Hayden Geological Survey
 Birger Sandzén - Sweden artist
 Naturalists and scientists
 Thomas D. Brock - Microbiologist
 Don G. Despain - Botanist - Yellowstone flora specialist
 Shaun Ellis (wolf researcher)
 Henry Gannett - Geographer, member of Hayden Surveys, named Electric Peak
 George Bird Grinnell - Early naturalist promoting Yellowstone
 William Henry Holmes - Early geologist documenting Yellowstone geothermal features
 A. Starker Leopold - author of the 1963 Leopold Report-Wildlife Management in the National Parks
 Bill McGuire - Volcano researcher
 L. David Mech - Wolf researcher
 Adolph Murie - National Park Service Wildlife Biologist - published seminar study on coyotes in Yellowstone (1940)
 Military
 John W. Barlow - Explored Yellowstone at same time as 1871 Hayden expedition
 William W. Belknap - Secretary of War (1869–1876) - Guided by Lt. Gustavus C. Doane on two week visit in 1876 to Yellowstone that followed Washburn route.
 Chris Madsen - U.S. Army guide - guided U.S. President Chester A. Arthur in Yellowstone (1883)
 General Philip Sheridan - Early U.S. Army protector of Yellowstone
 Captain Wilber E. Wilder - Acting Superintendent, March 15, 1899 – June 23, 1899
 Captain Samuel B. M. Young - Acting Superintendent, June 23, 1897 – November 15, 1897; Full Superintendent as a General, June 1, 1907 – November 28, 1908
 Politicians
 William H. Clagett - Montana Territorial Congressman, 1871-1872 - Introduced park creation bill in U.S. House of Representatives on December 18, 1871
 Henry L. Dawes - Congressman from Massachusetts (1863–1873) - strong supporter of park creation.  Chester Dawes, his son was a member of the 1871 Hayden survey and Anna the first boat on Yellowstone Lake was named after his daughter: Anna Dawes
 William D. Kelley - In 1871, he was the first Washington politician to suggest of what would later become Yellowstone National Park
 John F. Lacey - Iowa Congressman who sponsored The Lacey Act of 1884 to protect Yellowstone wildlife from poachers.
 Lucius Quintus Cincinnatus Lamar (II) - Secretary of Interior (March 1885 - January 1888) - Lamar River is named after him.
 Guy R. Pelton - U.S. congressman who died in Yellowstone (1890)
 Samuel C. Pomeroy - Kansas Senator, 1861-1873 - Introduced park creation bill into U.S. Senate on December 18, 1871
 Lyman Trumbull - Senator from Illinois who supported Yellowstone creation act - Father of Walter Trumbull, a member of the Washburn Party
 George Graham Vest - Senator from Missouri (1879–1903) - Self-appointed protector of Yellowstone
 Promoters
 Jay Cooke - Northern Pacific Railroad - Financed Nathaniel P. Langford's 1871 lectures on Yellowstone exploration
 Historic events
 Expeditions and the protection of Yellowstone (1869-1890)
 Nez Perce in Yellowstone Park
 History of the National Park Service
 1959 Hebgen Lake earthquake
 Mission 66 - National Park Service ten-year program to prepare parks for 1966 50th Anniversary
 Teton–Yellowstone tornado - F4 tornado - July 21, 1987
 Yellowstone fires of 1988
 Advocates
 Greater Yellowstone Coalition
 Yellowstone to Yukon Conservation Initiative
 Concessionaires
 Harry W. Child - Assembled and operated the Yellowstone Park Company
 Hamilton's Stores (Yellowstone National Park)
 John F. Yancey - operated Yancey's Pleasant Valley Hotel, 1884–1903
 Xanterra Parks and Resorts

Geography

 Rivers
 Bechler River
 Crawfish Creek
 Fall River
 Firehole River
 Gallatin River
 Gardner River
 Gibbon River
 Grand Canyon of the Yellowstone
 Heart River
 Lamar River
 Lewis River
 Madison River
 Slough Creek
 Snake River
 Yellowstone River
 Lakes
 Grebe Lake
 Heart Lake
 Isa Lake
 Lewis Lake
 Shoshone Lake
 Trout Lake
 Wrangler Lake
 Yellowstone Lake
 Mountains
 Abiathar Peak
 Absaroka Range
 Antler Peak
 Barronette Peak
 Bunsen Peak
 Clagett Butte
 Colter Peak
 Cook Peak
 Douglas Knob
 Druid Peak
 Dunraven Peak
 Eagle Peak (Wyoming)
 Electric Peak
 Folsom Peak
 Gallatin Range
 Gray Peak (Wyoming)
 Hedges Peak
 Mount Chittenden
 Mount Doane
 Mount Everts
 Mount Hancock
 Mount Haynes
 Mount Holmes
 Mount Hornaday
 Mount Jackson
 Mount Norris
 Mount Schurz
 Mount Sheridan
 Mount Stevenson
 Mount Washburn
 National Park Mountain
 Prospect Peak
 Specimen Ridge
 Terrace Mountain
 The Thunderer
 Trischman Knob
 Younts Peak
 Waterfalls
 Bechler Falls
 Firehole Falls
 Iris Falls
 Kepler Cascades
 Lewis Falls
 Moose Falls
 Mystic Falls
 Tower Fall
 Terraced Falls
 Union Falls
 Virginia Cascades
 Yellowstone Falls
 Roads and passes
 Beartooth Highway
 Buffalo Bill Cody Scenic Byway
 Craig Pass
 Dunraven Pass
 Golden Gate Canyon
 Grand Loop Road
 Kingman Pass
 Sylvan Pass (Wyoming)
 Yellowstone Trail
 John D. Rockefeller, Jr. Memorial Parkway

Geology

 Geysers and thermal features
 Yellowstone Caldera
 Yellowstone Plateau
 Yellowstone hotspot
 List of Yellowstone geothermal features
 Lone Star Geyser Basin
 Lone Star Geyser
 Lower Geyser Basin
 A-0 Geyser
 Artesia Geyser
 Azure Spring
 Bead Geyser
 Botryoidal Spring
 Box Spring
 Clepsydra Geyser
 Dilemma Geyser
 Fountain Geyser
 Great Fountain Geyser
 Jet Geyser
 Labial Geyser
 Morning Geyser
 Narcissus Geyser
 Ojo Caliente Spring
 Pink Cone Geyser
 Pink Geyser
 Spindle Geyser
 White Dome Geyser
 Young Hopeful Geyser
 Midway Geyser Basin
 Excelsior Geyser
 Fountain Paint Pots
 Grand Prismatic Spring
 Opal Pool
 Turquoise Pool
 Upper Geyser Basin
 Anemone Geyser
 Artemisia Geyser
 Atomizer Geyser
 Aurum Geyser
 Baby Daisy Geyser
 Beauty Pool
 Beehive Geyser
 Big Cub Geyser
 Bijou Geyser
 Brilliant Pool
 Castle Geyser
 Chromatic Spring
 Comet Geyser
 Crested Pool
 Daisy Geyser
 Doublet Pool
 Economic Geyser Crater
 Fan and Mortar Geysers
 Giant Geyser
 Giantess Geyser
 Grand Geyser
 Grotto Geyser
 Lion Geyser
 Morning Glory Pool
 Old Faithful Geyser
 Pump Geyser
 Riverside Geyser
 Solitary Geyser
 Spasmodic Geyser
 Splendid Geyser
 Turban Geyser
 Vent Geyser
 West Thumb Geyser Basin
 Abyss Pool
 Big Cone
 Black Pool
 Fishing Cone
 Norris Geyser Basin
 Big Alcove Spring
 Echinus Geyser
 Emerald Spring
 Steamboat Geyser
 Gibbon Geyser Basin
 Beryl Spring
 Mammoth Hot Springs
 Mammoth Hot Springs
 Yellowstone River
 Sulphur Spring
 Geologic formations
 Huckleberry Ridge Tuff
 Inspiration Point
 Lava Creek Tuff
 Mesa Falls Tuff
 Obsidian Cliff
 Overhanging Cliff
 Sheepeater Cliff

Flora
 Thermus aquaticus
 Hadesarchaea

Fauna

 American bison
 Amphibians and reptiles of Yellowstone National Park
 Animals of Yellowstone
 Bighorn sheep
 Birds of Yellowstone National Park
 Grizzly bear
 Elk
 Fishes of Yellowstone National Park
 Gray wolf
 Greater Yellowstone Ecosystem
 History of wolves in Yellowstone
 Leopold Report - Seminal 1963 study: "Wildlife Management in the National Parks"
 Pronghorn
 Small mammals of Yellowstone National Park
 Wolf reintroduction
 Yellowstone cutthroat trout
 Yellowstone Park bison herd

Districts and structures

 National Register of Historic Places listings in Yellowstone National Park
 Districts
 Firehole Village
 Fort Yellowstone
 Grand Loop Road Historic District
 Grant Village
 Lake Fish Hatchery Historic District
 Mammoth Hot Springs Historic District
 North Entrance Road Historic District
 Roosevelt Lodge Historic District
 Old Faithful Historic District
 Yanceys, Wyoming
 Structures
 Canyon Hotel
 Hotels and Tourist Camps of Yellowstone National Park
 Fishing Bridge Museum
 Lake Hotel
 Lamar Buffalo Ranch
 Madison Museum
 Marshall's Hotel
 Norris Geyser Basin Museum
 Norris, Madison, and Fishing Bridge Museums
 Northeast Entrance Station
 Obsidian Cliff Kiosk
 Old Faithful Inn
 Old Faithful Lodge
 Old Faithful Museum of Thermal Activity
 Queen's Laundry Bath House
 Roosevelt Arch
 U.S. Post Office (Yellowstone National Park)

Recreation

 Angling in Yellowstone National Park
 Trails of Yellowstone National Park
 Continental Divide Trail - Traverses southwest corner of the park

Media coverage
 Yellowstone (UK TV series)

Trivia

 J. Audubon Woodlore - Fictional Disney ranger from Brownstone Park (a parody of Yellowstone)
 Salvatore Vasapolli - Photographic artist that produces Yellowstone calendars
 Supervolcano (docudrama) - 2005 BBC/Discovery Channel docudrama centered on the fictional eruption of the volcanic caldera of Yellowstone National Park
 USS Yellowstone (AD-27) - Shenandoah-class destroyer tender named for Yellowstone National Park (1945)
 USS Yellowstone (AD-41) - Yellowstone-class destroyer tender (1979)
 Yellowstone (film) - 1936 Murder mystery staged in Yellowstone
 Yellowstone Trail - Early transcontinental highway project
 Yellowstone: The Music of Nature - Yellowstone inspired music by Mannheim Steamroller (1989).
 Boeing Yellowstone Project - a project to replace its entire civil aircraft portfolio with advanced technology aircraft.

Entrance communities

 Montana
 Gardiner, Montana
 Cooke City-Silver Gate
 Livingston, Montana
 West Yellowstone, Montana
 Yellowstone Airport - Located in West Yellowstone, Montana
 Yellowstone National Park (part), Montana
 Wyoming
 Cody, Wyoming
 Yellowstone Regional Airport - Located in Cody, Wyoming
 Jackson, Wyoming
 Jackson Hole Airport
 Highways
 John D. Rockefeller, Jr. Memorial Parkway - Connects Grand Teton National Park and Yellowstone
 U.S. Route 14 - Eastern entrance  
 U.S. Route 20 - Western entrance, Eastern entrance
 U.S. Route 89 - Northern entrance, Southern entrance
 U.S. Route 191 - Western entrance, Southern entrance
 U.S. Route 212 - Northeast entrance
 U.S. Route 287 - Western entrance, Southern entrance

See also
 Bibliography of Yellowstone National Park

Wikipedia outlines
Outlines of geography and places